Neven (stylised as NEVEN) is Japanese dance and hip-hop group M-Flo's seventh original studio album, released on March 13, 2013, one year after their revival album, Square One. It is their second album to not publicly announce the featured vocalists on the CD.

Background

On December 19, 2012, M-Flo released a mix album, M-Flo DJ Mix: Bon! Enkai, featuring the set they would perform on December 21, 2012, at their second annual Bonenkai DJ event at Tokyo club Ageha. The mix album featured two new songs, "Tonite," which was performed with Minmi at the event, and "Transformerz (Version 2.0)," a clip of the rearranged version of the Transformers: Prime theme song.

Taku Takahashi became the musical director for the TV drama Biblia Koshodō no Jiken Techō, which starred Ayame Goriki and Akira. Takahashi wrote the opening theme "Biblorelo" and the main theme "Searching," as well as being the musical supervisor.

In February 2013, Verbal released , a business advice book and his first work as an author.

Cream, a band formed of M-Flo collaborators Minami (who began working with Verbal on BoA's "Bump Bump!" (2009) and worked on Square One) and Staxx T (who worked with Teriyaki Boyz) released their debut album Dreamin on February 27, 2013, which reached #30 on Oricon album charts.

In March 2013, Taku Takahashi released an EDM mix album called EDM WORLD Presented by ☆Taku Takahashi, as well as a Girls Generation non-stop mix album called Best Selection Non-Stop Mix.

Promotion

The song "Transformerz" was used as the theme song for the second series of Transformers: Prime in Japan, beginning from July 7, 2012. The first single from the album, "Tonite," was released digitally on December 5, 2012, and was featured on the mix album M-Flo DJ Mix: Bon! Enkai.

The song "Chance" was used as the theme song for the drama Return, which was the first drama released for download on UULA, a paid subscription smart phone entertainment application for SoftBank cellphones that began in February 2013. A music video for the song was also released on UULA in March 2013. The video was directed by drama director Masato Harada.

The leading track from the album, "Lover," was released in February 2013, and was their first physically released single since "Love Song" in 2005. The song featured a music video, which was the first to feature the members of M-Flo prominently since 2008's "Love Comes and Goes." It reached number 15 on the Billboard Japan Hot 100. When the song was initially released to iTunes, the vocalist was accidentally labelled on the song, as M-Flo + Miliyah, despite M-Flo's wishes for the vocalist's name not to be published.

M-Flo will hold M-Flo Tour 2013 "Neven" in June and July 2013, a four date Japan tour at Osaka, Nagoya, Fukuoka and Tokyo.

Conception and writing

Neven was produced a year after M-Flo's previous album, Square One, compared to the five years between Square One and Cosmicolor. In an interview with Vanity Mix, Verbal said that the album took less time because they had already worked out what styles and ideas they had wanted to work with in Square One. Starting on Neven came naturally, and they already had some idea of what they wanted to try next. "Butterfly" and "Chance" were songs written in sessions for Square One, but were re-arranged and included in Neven. "Butterfly" was performed at M-Flo's M-Flo Tour 2012 'Square One' tour in 2012, and a live performance is featured on ''Nevens DVD.

Taku Takahashi announced on his Twitter that the album was completed on February 4, 2013.

Verbal also felt that he worked together more with Taku Takahashi on the album than on Square One, and that many aspects of Square One showed off each members' solo career more. He also thought that the album had a stronger house feel, instead of Square One's mix of genres, such as drum and bass and hip-hop.

The album's title, Neven, is a portmanteau of "neverland" and "seven" (it being the group's 7th studio album). M-Flo also chose Neven due to the word being a symmetric palindrome, and felt that it was a symbol of cycles. The album features four entirely English tracks: "Yeah!" "No Way," "Das Dance (Like That)" and "Fnky Algorthm," as well as the mostly English track "Butterfly."

The album features six vocalists collaborating with M-Flo, who are not officially announced on the CD, much like on their previous album, Square One. Two collaborators from Square One return: Minami, vocalist of the band Cream, worked on four songs: "Butterfly," "Fnky Algorthm," "One in a Million" and "Yeah!" Matt Cab, who worked on the song "Yesterday," also made an appearance on Neven, on the song "Das Dance (Like That)."

The album also features two songs by musicians who worked with M-Flo during their loves... era (2003—2009): Minmi, who was on "Lotta Love" from M-Flo Inside: Works Best II (2006), performs "Tonite," and Miliyah Kato, who was featured on the album track "One Day" from Beat Space Nine (2005), performed the leading single "Lover."

Two new musicians feature on Neven. Singer Unico, who entered the Avex club music talent audition Starz Audition 2008, worked on the song "Journey X." Model Kiko Mizuhara is a featured rapper on the song "No Way," in her musician debut. Mizuhara worked together with Verbal as a Reebok ambassador. After going to karaoke together, Verbal offered to work with Mizuhara.

"Chance" is sung by Taku Takahashi, the first time he has done so since "Love Long and Prosper" in 2007. Originally, another person was meant to sing the vocals on the track, but due to scheduling issues, they used the demo vocals as-is. Verbal said that the hardest part of creating the album was scheduling vocalists to come to their personal studio.

Track listing

Personnel

Personnel details were sourced from Nevens liner notes booklet.Managerial Ryuhei Chiba – executive supervision
 Koichi Fukugawa – artist management for Artimage
 Shinji Hayashi – executive supervision
 Emi Iwamoto – assistant desk for management for Ambush
 Daichi Kagawa – interlude management
 Masato "Max" Matsuura – executive production for Avex Group

 Kensuke Ozaku – artist management for Ambush, Artimage
 Yoshihiro Seki – general producer for Avex Entertainment, inc.
 Ichiro Shimizu – production management and recording director
 Taku Takahashi – executive producer, production
 Shigeru Takeuchi – executive supervision
 Verbal (Young-Kee Yu) – direction, executive producer for Ambush, general concept, productionPerformance credits Masako Ikeda – interlude voice acting, "Neven Goddess" (track 1, 14)
 Daisuke Muroya – viola, violin (track 1)

 Kaori Nazuka – interlude voice acting, "Brink Investigator A B" (track 12, 17)
 Atsuki Tani – interlude voice acting, "Frame Investigator" (track 4, 8, 14)Visuals and imagery Hiroshi Manaka – photography
 Yoshirotten Nishi – Art direction, styling
 Go Takakusagi – hair, make-up

 Yuuki Watanabe – CG
 Yoon – Creative direction, stylingTechnical and production'''

 Seiya Haga – sound editing (track 1, 4, 8, 12)
 Takeshi Hara – recording engineer (track 11)
 Mitsunori Ikeda – mixing and programming engineer (track 2-3, 5-7, 9-11, 13, 15-16), recording engineer (track 7, 9, 16)
 Osamu "Shu" Imamoto – recording engineer (track 16)
 Miliyah Kato – chorus arrangement (track 11)
 Yasuji Maeda – mastering

 Ryosuke Nakanishi – sound editing (track 4, 8, 12), soundtrack and programming engineer (track 1, 14, 17)
 Dai Satō – Neven interludes author
 Seiji Sekine – mixing and recording engineer (track 1, 4, 8, 12, 14, 17)
 Taku Takahashi – programming engineer (track 2-13, 15-16), soundtrack (track 4, 8, 12)
 Shinsaku Takane – recording engineer (track 3)
 Muga Takeda – Neven interludes co-author
 Lucas Valentine – recording engineer (track 2-3, 5-6, 9-11, 13, 15)

Charts and sales

Daily and weekly charts

Sales

Release history

References

2013 albums
Avex Group albums
Japanese-language albums
M-Flo albums